Burns Guitars London is an English manufacturer of electric guitars and bass guitars, founded by Alice Louise Farrell (1908–1993) and James Ormston (Jim) Burns (1925–1998) in 1959. The company was first named "Burns-Weill", then renamed "Ormston Burns Ltd". At its peak, in the 1960s, it was the most successful guitar company in England.

Ormston Burns Ltd. was bought up by Baldwin Piano Company in 1965, and the company was renamed "Baldwin-Burns". Burns guitars were reintroduced in 1991 under the name "Burns London", and the product line now includes a collector's edition of the first model the company produced.

History 

Jim Burns set out to make, in his own words, "mass produced one-offs", such as the Marvin, a radical take on the Stratocaster style with many more differences than it is generally credited with The Bison, now considered as a classic, combined fewer Fender influences with a shorter scale length of 25 inches, and the "Wild Dog" electronics, allowing the high-output Tri-Sonic pickups to be selected in many different, and sometimes unusual, combinations. Burns had a proprietary vibrato system, which was used also on Gretsch guitars.

The original guitars made many showbiz friends, and were seen in the hands of some high-profile performers of the time, such as Elvis Presley, Hank Marvin and Jimmy Page, and were quite popular since they were much cheaper than US brands such as Fender and Gibson, helped also by import tariffs that made it expensive to buy US-made guitars in Britain.

Jim Burns' first commercial foray into electric guitar making came in 1958 when he designed and built the "Ike Isaacs Short Scale Model" for the Supersound Company. The timing of the establishment of Burns London was perfect with the British guitar market experiencing a huge boom, in part thanks to the popularity of British pop bands like The Shadows, and again thanks to the high tariffs on US-made goods. The US brand Ampeg imported British-made Burns guitars for a short time prior to the Baldwin takeover. Apart from the pickguard badge ('Ampeg by Burns of London') these were exactly the same as their British counterparts.

Burns manufactured guitar amplifiers as well; the Jimi Hendrix Experience acquired a few small 30-watt amps in 1966, but desired "big clout, you know, big amplifiers", according to Mitch Mitchell.

Despite the good times for guitar sales, Ormston Burns Ltd. was sold in 1965 to the Baldwin Piano and Organ Company of Cincinnati for the price of $380,000, small money in comparison to the $13 million paid at the time for Fender (where Baldwin were outbid by CBS). The company was renamed Baldwin-Burns (latterly Baldwin) and released three amplifiers at the NAMM Show of June 1965. Collectors insist that the Baldwin-era instruments were somehow inferior to those produced before the takeover, but with the exception of some newly-introduced models, the quality standards on models like the Marvin, Jazz Guitar and Shadows bass remained consistent, with only minor cosmetic differences and the Baldwin badge to distinguish them from the Burns-branded era of production. For a short time, existing stock was rebadged (initially as 'Baldwin-Burns', then simply 'Baldwin') by the simple expedient of inserting a routed nameplate into the pickguard, from which the earlier Burns routing had been excised. This practise did not last long, and original Baldwin pickguards appeared shortly afterwards, identical to the Burns originals save for the Baldwin routing. Other commercially-driven changes included the replacement of the elaborate, carved scroll head (seen on earlier versions of the Marvin, Virginian and others) with a simpler design, and a standardised neck began to appear on most models around 1967, consisting of this 'flat' scroll head and a bound fingerboard. Towards the end of the 1960s, Baldwin took the decision to concentrate on the Gretsch range of guitars and drums which they had acquired in 1967, and the Baldwin guitar brand was wound down, with production coming to an end in 1970.

Burns Guitars from 1970–1983 

While the original Burns guitar line ended in 1970, Jim Burns never quite stopped working on his creations. Several attempts were made to revive the Burns name, in between projects with entirely new companies. In 1966, Jim Burns, unable to use the Burns name, started a new company called Ormston, formed initially to market a range of pedal steel guitars made by Denley. In 1968, just before Ormston shut its doors also, Jim Burns created an original guitar which later became a prototype for the Hayman range, which came about after being hired by the Dallas-Arbiter Organisation to work on a new range of guitars under the name of Hayman. The line lasted from 1969 to 1973, and enjoyed a fair share of popularity. 

During the '70s, two more attempts were made at resurrecting the Burns guitar line. Again, due to the agreement with Baldwin, the Burns name could not be used, so the first attempt was named "Burns UK", and the second called "Jim Burns Actualizers Ltd."

Burns UK (1974-77)

"Burns UK" appeared in 1974 and lasted until 1977. Burns UK guitars were manufactured close to Newcastle upon Tyne in Jim Burns' native north east. Only one guitar model sold well, The Flyte, which was originally to be named the Conchorde, after the supersonic plane, because of its shape. Its design proved popular among glam rock performers of the time, such as Slade and Marc Bolan. Despite their unconventional design (which often added to the production cost), the guitars had a rather conventional sound, and again Burns ceased to produce guitars—but not before of few examples of the Burns Mirage, the successor to the Flyte, had been produced.

Jim Burns Actualizers Ltd. (1979–1983)
Jim Burns Actualizers Ltd. was established in 1979 at Littleport near Ely in Cambridgeshire, and lasted another four years, into 1983, and produced some more recognisably "Burns" guitars. These were the Steer, Scorpion, Magpie and Bandit. There was also the first attempt to recreate the Bison and Marvin in updated form.  The Burns Steer, a semi-acoustic altered to reduce feedback, was popularized by singer Billy Bragg. A variant of the Scorpion was produced for Chris Stein of Blondie in very small numbers.

Burns London Ltd. 
After Jim Burns Ltd, no more Burns guitars appeared on the market until 1992, when the company was restarted by Barry Gibson, who employed Jim Burns as a consultant in the company. The original idea was to manufacture handmade replicas of famous Burns guitars from previous incarnations, such as the Marvin and the Nu-Sonic; Gaz Coombes of Supergrass played a reissue of the Bison. Later on, in 1999, the company began work on a budget line called the Club Series, outsourcing production to Korea. The Club Series became the first Burns guitars ever to be manufactured outside of Britain, but the original Burns design ethics, construction and style didn't suffer as a result, with the range exploding in popularity throughout the following years. The Club Series expanded quickly, many Jim Burns-designed guitars constructed from 1960 to 1983 receiving its own budget model, such as the Marquee which was a budget version of The Marvin, the Steer (most famously played by Billy Bragg, the London Steer being a copy of a Steer guitar built and given to Billy by Jim Burns many years ago), the Bison and even the Barracuda six-string bass/baritone model. Newer designs have begun to emerge in the last few years, usually building upon the designs of the '60s originals, such as the Batwing, a Marquee with a Bison-style headstock. Burns also worked with Queen guitarist Brian May to produce a copy of May's Red Special guitar (which uses Burns Tri-Sonic pickups), and this model was awarded "Best Electric Guitar of the Year 2001" by Guitarist magazine.

An even cheaper range (manufactured in China) has emerged with two new models, the Cobra and the Nu-Sonic. The Cobra is the closest Burns have come to a straight copy in its lifetime. The body is that of a Stratocaster, but the model retains the sectioned pickguard, Tri-Sonic pickups and (shrunken) batwing headstock common to other Burns guitars. Meanwhile, the Nu-Sonic borrows the name of an original Burns guitar, and resembles more the Fender Telecaster, albeit with a distinctly different pickup setup with two Tri-Sonics and a bridge humbucker borrowing directly from the Steer. As well as the pickups, it also retains the shrunken batwing headstock of its cousin, as well as a German carve around the front edge of the guitar.

Notes

References

External links

 

Guitar manufacturing companies
British companies established in 1960
Manufacturing companies established in 1960
1960 establishments in England
Musical instrument manufacturing companies based in London